Yajnavalkya or Yagyavalkya is a Hindu Vedic sage figuring in the Brihadaranyaka Upanishad (c. 700 BCE). Yajnavalkya proposes and debates metaphysical questions about the nature of existence, consciousness and impermanence, and expounds the epistemic doctrine of neti neti ("not this, not this") to discover the universal Self and Ātman. Texts attributed to him include the Yajnavalkya Smriti, Yoga Yajnavalkya and some texts of the Vedanta school. He is also mentioned in various Brahmanas and Aranyakas.

Setting
The Brihadaranyaka Upanishad is dated at c. 700 BCE,. Staal notes that though the name Yajnavalkya is derived from yajna, which connotes ritual, Yajnavalkya is referred to as "a thinker, not a ritualist".

Yājñavalkya was the pupil of Uddālaka Āruṇi, whom he defeated in debate.

In the Brihadaranyaka Upanishad, a set of dialogues portrays Yajnavalkya as having two wives, one Maitreyi who challenges Yajnavalkya with philosophical questions like a scholarly wife; the other Katyayani who is silent but mentioned as a housewife. While Yajnavalkya and Katyayani lived in contented domesticity, Maitreyi studied metaphysics and engaged in theological dialogues with her husband in addition to "making self-inquiries of introspection". In contrast to the Brihadaranyaka Upanishad, the epic Mahabharata states Maitreyi is a young beauty who is an Advaita scholar but never marries.

The figure of Yajnavalkya is considered by Scharfstein as one of the earliest philosophers in recorded history. Yajnavalkya is credited by Witzel for coining the term Advaita (non-duality of Atman and Brahman). The ideas attributed to him for renunciation of worldly attachments have been important to Hindu sannyasa traditions.

Texts

Yajnavalkya is associated with several other major ancient texts in Sanskrit, namely the Shukla Yajurveda, the Shatapatha Brahmana, the Brihadaranyaka Upanishad, the Dharmasastra named Yājñavalkya Smṛti, Vriddha Yajnavalkya, and Brihad Yajnavalkya. He is also mentioned in the Mahabharata and the Puranas, as well as in ancient Jainism texts such as the Isibhasiyaim.

Another important and influential Yoga text in Hinduism is named after him, namely Yoga Yajnavalkya, but its author is unclear. The actual author of Yoga Yajnavalkya text was probably someone who lived many centuries after the Vedic sage Yajnavalkya, and is unknowIng Yajnavalkya was father, Vajasaneya was his biological son, who wrote or explained Yoga Yajnavalkya in writings to his descendants!
 Ian Whicher, a professor of Religion at the University of Manitoba, states that the author of Yoga Yajnavalkya may be an ancient Yajnavalkya, but this Yajnavalkya is not to be confused with the Vedic-era Yajnavalkya "who is revered in Hinduism for Brihadaranyaka Upanishad".

According to Vishwanath Narayan Mandlik, these references to Yajnavalkya in other texts, in addition to the eponymous Yoga Yajnavalkya, may be to different sages with the same name.

Ideas

On karma and rebirth
One of the early expositions of karma and rebirth theories appear in the discussions of Yajnavalkya.

Max Muller and Paul Deussen, in their respective translations, describe the Upanishad's view of "Soul, Self" and "free, liberated state of existence" as, "[Self] is imperishable, for he cannot perish; he is unattached, for he does not attach himself; unfettered, he does not suffer, he does not fail. He is beyond good and evil, and neither what he has done, nor what he has omitted to do, affects him. (...) He therefore who knows it [reached self-realization], becomes quiet, subdued, satisfied, patient, and collected. He sees self in Self, sees all as Self. Evil does not overcome him, he overcomes all evil. Evil does not burn him, he burns all evil. Free from evil, free from spots, free from doubt, he became Atman-Brâhmana; this is the Brahma-world, O King, thus spoke Yajnavalkya."

On spiritual liberation
The section 4.3 of the Brihadaranyaka Upanishad is attributed to Yajnavalkya, and it discusses the premises of moksha (liberation, freedom), and provides some of its most studied hymns. Paul Deussen calls it, "unique in its richness and warmth of presentation", with profoundness that retains its full worth in modern times.

On the light of man 
When asked by King Janaka,"What is the light of man?" he replies, "The sun, O King; for, having the sun alone for his light, man sits, moves about, does his work, and returns." Then the king asks, "When the sun sets, what is the light of man?" He replies, "The moon indeed is his light; for, having the moon alone for his light, man sits, moves about, does his work, and returns." Then the king asks, "When the sun has set, O Yajnavalkya, and the moon has set, what is the light of man ?" He replies, "Fire indeed is his light; for, having fire alone for his light, man sits, moves about, does his work, and returns." Then the king asks, "When the sun has set, O Yajnavalkya, and the moon has set, and the fire is gone out, what is then the light of man?" He replies, "Sound indeed is his light; for, having sound alone for his light, man sits, moves about, does his work, and returns. Therefore, O King, when one cannot see even one's own hand, yet when a sound is raised, one goes towards it." Then the king asks, "When the sun has set, O Yajnaavalkya, and the moon has set, and the fire is gone out, and the sound hushed, what is then the light of man?" He replies, "The Self indeed is his light; for, having the Self alone as his light, man sits, moves about, does his work, and returns."

On Self 
He describes the self by a series of negations and says it is not, not (neti, neti) - not graspable, not destructible, not attached, not disturbed by anything good or bad done by himself. He then says, he who knows this truth remains "controlled, at peace, patient and full of faith" and "everyone comes to be his self" and "he becomes the self of everyone"

On Dreams 
Yajnavlkya believed that dreams are active projections of the self.To him, this is evidence of that dreaming shares the creative nature of Reality in itself.

On love and soul
The Maitreyi-Yajnavalkya dialogue of Brihadaranyaka Upanishad states that love is driven by "love for oneself (ātman)," and it discusses the nature of Atman and Brahman and their unity, the core of the later Advaita philosophy. The Maitreyi-Yajnavalkya dialogue has survived in two manuscript recensions from the Madhyamdina and Kanva Vedic schools; although they have significant literary differences, they share the same philosophical theme.

This dialogue appears in several Hindu texts; the earliest is in chapter 2.4 – and modified in chapter 4.5 – of the Brihadaranyaka Upanishad, one of the principal and oldest Upanishads. Adi Shankara, a scholar of the influential Advaita Vedanta school of Hindu philosophy, wrote in his Brihadaranyakopanishad bhashya that the purpose of the Maitreyi-Yajnavalkya dialogue in chapter 2.4 of the Brihadaranyaka Upanishad is to highlight the importance of the knowledge of Atman and Brahman, and to understand their oneness. According to Shankara, the dialogue suggests renunciation is prescribed in the Sruti (vedic texts of Hinduism), as a means to knowledge of the Brahman and Atman. He adds, that the pursuit of self-knowledge is considered important in the Sruti because the Maitreyi dialogue is repeated in chapter 4.5 as a "logical finale" to the discussion of Brahman in the Upanishad.

Concluding his dialogue on the "inner self", or soul, Yajnavalkaya tells Maitreyi:

After Yajnavalkya leaves and becomes a sannyasi, Maitreyi becomes a sannyasini – she too wanders and leads a renunciate's life.

See also
Neti neti
Ancient Mithila University
Janaka of Videha
Gargi Vachaknavi
Uddalaka Aruni
Ashtavakra
Yajnavalkya Ashram

References

Bibliography

External links

 
 
 Sukla Yajur Veda from http://www.shuklayajurveda.org
 Yogeeswara Yagnavalkya

7th-century BC people
8th-century BC people
Mithila
Rishis
Ancient Indian philosophers
Scholars from Bihar
8th-century BC Indian philosophers
7th-century BC Indian philosophers
7th-century BC mathematicians
Maithil Brahmin
Philosophers of love
Upanishadic people